Cathrine Instebø (born 28 November 1973) is a Norwegian former professional tennis player.

Instebø, the first professional tennis player to come from Bergen, reached career best world rankings of 632 in singles and 579 in doubles. A five-time national singles champion, she competed for the Norway Federation Cup team from 1990 to 1993. She later played collegiate tennis for the University of Florida.

References

External links
 
 
 

1973 births
Living people
Norwegian female tennis players
Florida Gators women's tennis players